Blonde Vinyl was an independent record label founded in 1990 by Michael Knott. The Encyclopedia of Contemporary Christian Music  describes the label as "one of Christian music's first true indie labels."

Background
Blonde Vinyl signed bands with styles that were viable in the underground of the general market but rarely found their way into the Christian market—old school punk, garage rock, grunge, gothic, EBM/industrial, synthpop/house, spoken word, acoustic pop.

Blonde Vinyl folded in 1993 when its distributor, Spectra, went bankrupt. After bankruptcy, Knott attempted to resurrect Blonde Vinyl under the name Siren Records. Siren managed two releases before going bankrupt: World Tour by LSU Cash in Chaos and Beautiful Dazzling Music No. 1 by Rainbow Rider (Dance House Children). After the failure of Siren, Knott started the band Aunt Bettys.

Sub-labels
Three sub-labels were created to further classify the diverse musical styles that were being released on Blonde Vinyl: Voice of the Youth, SLAVA Music, and Blonde Vinyl Inspirational.

Voice of the Youth was created for the edgier alternative releases on Blonde Vinyl. Six albums were released under this imprint: product # bvcd 3482 (love gift) by Breakfast with Amy, Go, Fluffy, Go! by Fluffy, Screaming Brittle Siren by Michael Knott, The Grape Prophet by L.S. Underground, Plague of Ethyls, and As Blue as the State Allows by Sass o' Frass Tunic.

SLAVA Music existed as an underground industrial music-focused label before joining with Blonde Vinyl for distribution. Three albums were released under this imprint: Digital Priests - the Remixes by Deitiphobia, Revelation 1921 by Wigtop, and the SLAVA compilation.

Blonde Vinyl Inspirational was created for praise and worship music. The only release on this imprint was Quiet Assurance by N Side Out.

Notable artists
Breakfast with Amy
Dance House Children
Dead Artist Syndrome
Deitiphobia
LSU
Lifesavers
Lust Control
Michael Knott
Scaterd Few
Sincerely Paul (2 of the Original Band members of S.P. are in the band SLIDE)
Steve Scott
Tribe of Dan

Compilations
Blonde Vinyl Teaser I (BVCD007 - 1991)
Blonde Vinyl Teaser II / Food for Thought (BVCD0072 - 1991)
SLAVA Compilation - Voice of the People (BVCD3442 - 1992)
Radioactive Hits: The Definitive Blonde Vinyl Collection (84418-885-1 - 1993)

See also
 List of record labels

References

Further reading

External links
Michael Knott's home page
Discogs: Blonde Vinyl
CMA: Blonde Vinyl

Record labels established in 1990
1990 establishments in the United States
Record labels disestablished in 1993
American independent record labels
Indie rock record labels
Alternative rock record labels
Christian record labels